John Varty (born 27 November 1950) is a South African wildlife filmmaker who has made more than 30 documentaries and one feature film. Varty is an author, singer-songwriter and activist. He co-owns Londolozi Game Reserve and Tiger Canyon - A project which aims to create a free-ranging, self-sustaining tiger population outside of Asia.

Early life 
John Varty attended Parktown Boys' High School in Johannesburg. As a child, John learned about hunting on the family game farm near the Kruger National Park.

After his father, Charles, died, John and his brother, Dave Varty, terminated the hunting activities and converted it into a game reserve in 1973. They renamed it Londolozi, which is the Zulu word for "protector of living things". Since then it has become one of the top resorts in the world and was included in Travel and Leisure's world's best 4 times in the late 90s and early 2000s.

In the News 
2012 - John Varty mauled by a tiger

2014 - January 2014 KIA South Africa released a TV commercial, Tiger in Africa, with John Varty's footage shot at Tiger Canyons.

2019 - John Varty offered Johannesburg zoo R1m to release an elephant

2019 - Wildlife filmmaker Varty joins protest to close East London's zoo

Awards
John made several documentaries that were widely distributed: Living with Tigers, Shingalana, Jamu, the Orphaned Leopard. Swift and silent won an American Cable TV award in 1993 and The Silent Hunter won The New York Gold Award.

Filmography 

*Leopard Queen, appeared in, **A Secret Life, with Gillian van Houten and Elmon Mhlongo, ***Running Wild, appeared in, with  Brooke Shields

Tiger Rewilding project
In 2000, John started a Bengal tiger re-wilding project near Philippolis in the Free State. Starting with captive bred tigers, the aim is to establish a wild tiger population outside of Asia. In 2003, the progress was documented in a The Discovery Channel production called Living with Tigers. In 2011, National Geographic made a second documentary called Tiger Man of Africa. In 2019, Getaway reported there were 18 Bengal tigers at Tiger Canyon.

Singer and Songwriter 
John Varty writes and performs conservation songs with titles "Big Cat Love", "Celebrate the Big Cats", The Tracker", "Rolling Thunder", "Masai Man" etc.

Controversy 
2012 - Varty stated a one-off auction might help to preserve rhinos.

2004 - The tiger rewilding project was the subject of controversy in 2004 after public accusations of misuse of funds by investors Stuart Bray and wife, Li Quan following the release of Living with Tigers. The investors and an American conservationist questioned how some filming footage was obtained and a dispute followed. John Varty was granted a court interdict on March 17 from the Bloemfontein High Court restraining Quan and Bray from harassment.

Bibliography
 Nine Lives - Memoirs of a Maverick (2011) 
 In the Jaws of the Tiger (2013)

Other articles/books
 Varty, Boyd. Cathedral of the Wild: An African Journey Home, Random House (2014).

References

External links
  documentary
 Discovery Channel profile
 Tiger Man of Africa
 Guardian article on Londolozi and Mandela

South African zoologists
Living people
South African conservationists
1950 births
People from Johannesburg
Alumni of Parktown Boys' High School